The 2018–19 North Caledonian Football League (known for sponsorship reasons as the Macleod & MacCallum North Caledonian League) was the 110th season of the North Caledonian Football League. The season began on 1 September 2018. Orkney were the defending champions.

Golspie Sutherland won their tenth league title, their first in four years.

Teams

League table

References 

North Caledonian Football League seasons